Thanh Liêm is a rural district of Hà Nam province in the Red River Delta region of Vietnam. As of 2019 the district had a population of 144,760. The district covers an area of 175.02 km². The district capital lies at Tân Thanh.

References

Districts of Hà Nam province